Salkia Vikram Vidyalaya is a Higher Secondary School, situated at 37/1 Bhairab Dutta Lane, Salkia, Howrah-711106, West Bengal, India.
Salkia Vikram Vidyalaya was established on 5 January 1935.

About School 
Vikramaditya Sharma and his brother Chandrika Prasad Sharma laid the foundation stones of the school. The students belonged to the Hindi speaking people of Howrah, mainly expats of Bihar and Uttar Pradesh in suburban Kolkata, West Bengal.

It provides education to all classes of people, from primary education to secondary, up to higher secondary level in Science, commerce and arts streams.

It has a branch school named Vikram Vidyalaya (Branch) situated near Tikiapara Railway Bridge.

The main branch has two large buildings, with three floors in each building.

A primary teachers training institute was also located in the school which has been shifted somewhere in Chatterjee Hat, Shibpur, Howrah.

See also
Education in India
List of schools in India
Education in West Bengal

References

External links

Primary schools in West Bengal
High schools and secondary schools in West Bengal
Schools in Howrah district
Education in Howrah
Educational institutions established in 1935
1935 establishments in India